Estevanico ("Little Stephen"; modern spelling Estebanico; –1539), also known as Esteban de Dorantes or Mustafa Azemmouri (مصطفى الزموري), was the first African to explore North America. 

Estevanico first appears as a slave in Portuguese records in Morocco, with him being sold to a Spanish nobleman in about 1521. In 1527 he joined the Spanish Narváez expedition to explore "La Florida", present-day Northern Mexico and Southern United States.

He has been referred to as "the first great African man in America". He became a folk hero in the folklore of Spain and legend in New Spain, his exploration and cataloging of the Gulf of Mexico, and what is today modern Florida and Texas, resulted in numerous legends about him. During his final exploration and disappearance in New Mexico, and what would become the Southwestern United States, he became mythologized as part of stories involving the Seven Cities of Gold in Santa Fe de Nuevo México.

Background
Very little is known about the background of Estevanico. The most comprehensive description of his origins consists of just one line written by Álvar Núñez Cabeza de Vaca in his Spanish account of the Narváez Expedition. Cabeza de Vaca wrote that he was a "negro alárabe, natural de Azamor", which can be translated as "an Arabized black, native to Azemmour" or "an Arabic-speaking black man, a native of Azamor". This same chronicle does not mention Estevanico's enslavement but other contemporary documents make it clear that he was owned by Andrés Dorantes de Carranza, a Spanish nobleman who participated in the expedition.

Most contemporary accounts referred to him by his personal nicknames Estevanico, Azemmouri, or simply el negro (a common Spanish term, meaning "the black").

As a young man, Estevanico was sold into slavery in 1522 in the Portuguese-controlled Moroccan town of Azemmour, on the Atlantic coast. He was sold to Andrés Dorantes de Carranza. Slavery in Spain was very different, and there were paths to freedom more readily available in the Spanish Empire. It is unclear if Azemmouri was raised Muslim but Spain did not allow non-Catholics to travel to New Spain, so he would have been baptized as a Catholic in order to join the expedition. His Christian name Estevan, a Spanish form of "Stephen," confirms this.

Narváez Expedition

The expedition of some 300 men, led by the newly appointed adelantado (governor) of La Florida, Pánfilo de Narváez, left Cuba in February 1528 intending to go to Isla de las Palmas near present-day Tampico, Mexico, to establish two settlements. Storms and strong winds forced the fleet to the western coast of Florida. The Narváez expedition landed in present-day St. Petersburg, Florida, on the shores of Boca Ciega Bay. Narváez ordered his ships, and 100 men and 10 women to sail north in search of a large harbor that his pilots assured them was nearby. He led another 300 men, with 42 horses, north along the coast, intending to rejoin his ships at the large harbor. There is no large harbor north of Boca Ciega Bay, and Narváez never saw his ships again.

After marching 300 miles north, and having armed confrontations with Native Americans, the survivors built boats to sail westward along the Gulf Coast shoreline hoping to reach Pánuco and the Rio de las Palmas. A storm struck when they were near Galveston Island, Texas. Approximately 80 men survived the storm, being washed ashore at Galveston Island.  After 1529, three survivors from one boat, including Estevanico, became enslaved by Coahuiltecan Indians; in 1532, they were reunited with a survivor from a different boat, Álvar Núñez Cabeza de Vaca. The four spent years enslaved on the Texas barrier islands.

In 1534 the four survivors escaped into the American interior and became medicine men. The four men, Cabeza de Vaca, Andrés Dorantes de Carranza, Alonso del Castillo Maldonado and Estevan, escaped captivity in 1534 and traveled west into present-day Texas Southwestern US, and Northern Mexico. They were the first Europeans and African to enter the American West. Having walked nearly 2,000 miles since their initial landing in Florida, they finally reached a Spanish settlement in Sinaloa. They traveled from there to Mexico City, 1,000 miles to the south. As medicine men they were treated with great respect and offered food, shelter, and gifts, and villages held celebrations in their honor. When they decided they wanted to leave, the host village would guide them to the next village. Sometimes as many as 3,000 people would follow them to the next village. The party traversed the continent as far as western Mexico, into the Sonoran Desert to the region of Sonora in New Spain (present-day Mexico). After finding a small Spanish settlement, the four survivors travelled 1,000 miles to the south to Mexico City, arriving in July 1536.

Cabeza de Vaca published the Relación, a book about their 8-year survival journey, in 1542 and included information about Estevanico. It was reprinted again in 1555. It was the first published book  to describe the peoples, wildlife, flora and fauna of inland North America, and the first to describe the American bison. In the Relación, Cabeza de Vaca said Estevanico often went in advance of the other three survivors because Estevanico had learned some parts of the indigenous language.

Expedition to New Mexico
In Mexico City, the four survivors told stories of wealthy indigenous tribes to the north, which created a stir among Spaniards in Mexico. When the three Spaniards declined to lead an expedition to the north, Antonio de Mendoza, the Viceroy of New Spain, commissioned Fray Marcos de Niza to lead an expedition north in search of the fabled Seven Cities of Cibola. Estevanico was instructed to serve as a guide for the expedition. In a letter to Charles V, Mendoza wrote "I retained a negro who had come with Dorantes". According to a contemporary source, Mendoza either purchased Estevanico or received him as a gift from Dorantes.

On 7 March 1539, the expedition left from Culiacán, the northernmost Spanish settlement in Nueva Galicia.  Estevanico traveled ahead of the main party with a group of Sonoran Indians and a quantity of trade goods. As before, he assumed the role of a medicine man, wearing bells and feathers on his arms and ankles and carrying a gourd rattle decorated with strings of bells and two feathers. He was instructed by Fray Marcos to communicate by sending back crosses to the main party, with the size of the cross indicating the importance of his discoveries. One day, a cross arrived that was as tall as a person and the messengers said that Estevanico had heard reports of seven large and wealthy cities in a land to the north called Cíbola. The advance party proceeded to the north in search of Cíbola despite instructions from Fray Marcos to wait for him.

Death accounts
When Estevanico was within a day's journey of Cíbola, he sent a messenger ahead to announce his arrival. When informed of Estevanico's impending visit, the chief of the first village angrily ordered the messenger to leave and threatened to kill anyone who came back. Estevanico seemed unconcerned by these threats and proceeded to Cíbola. When the party arrived, the villagers took their trade goods and held them overnight without food or water. One of the Indians who had been with Estevanico's party managed to escape and hide nearby. The next morning he saw the men of Cíbola chasing Estevanico and shooting arrows at him. He did not see what happened to the African, but others in his party were killed. The hidden Indian hurried to tell Fray Marcos what he had witnessed.

Upon hearing the news of the attack, Fray Marcos hurried forward. Soon he met two more Sonorans from the advance party who were wounded and bloodstained. They did not know for certain the fate of Estevanico but they assumed he was dead. After hearing this, De Niza quickly returned to New Spain and wrote an account of his expedition for the viceroy. In his Relacíon, he reported on the death of Estevanico at Hawikuh as related to him by members of the African's party. 

A year later, a much larger Spanish expedition led by Francisco Vázquez de Coronado reached the pueblo where Estevanico was reported killed. In August 1540, he wrote to the viceroy that "the death of the negro is perfectly certain because many of the things which he wore have been found." He also wrote that the inhabitants of the Zuni pueblo where he died had killed Estevanico because he was a "bad man" who killed and assaulted their women. 

Other contemporary accounts of Estevanico's death are known. Pedro de Castañeda de Nájera, a chronicler of the Coronado expedition, wrote that the men of Cibola killed him because they were offended when he asked them for turquoise and women. Hernando Alarcon, also a member of the expedition, was told that when Estevanico bragged that he had numerous armed followers nearby, the chiefs of Cibola killed him before he could reveal their location to his followers. Sancho Dorantes de Carranza, the grandson of Andrés Dorantes de Carranza, wrote that Estevanico was "shot through with arrows like a Saint Sebastian."

Modern historians have advanced other theories to explain Estevanico's death. Roberts and Roberts have suggested that Estevanico, who wore owl feathers and carried a medicine-man's gourd, may have been seen by the Zuni as impersonating a medicine man, which they punished by death. Others theorize that he may have resembled an evil sorcerer who existed in the Zuni religion, the "Chaikwana" kachina." 

Juan Francisco Maura suggested in 2002 that the Zuni did not kill Estevanico, but rather he and his friends remained among the A:shiwi who probably helped him fake his death so he could regain his freedom. Some folklore legends say that the Kachina figure, Chakwaina, is based on Azemmouri.

Legacy
Estevanico was the first non-Native to visit Pueblo lands.

Representation in other media
The Moor's Account, a 2014 novel by American writer Laila Lalami, is a fictional memoir of Estevanico.
Estevanico, a poem by Jeffrey Yang, was published in Poetry, July/August 2017. It is "narrated" by the Spanish explorer Álvar Núñez Cabeza de Vaca and recounts his years of exploration in the New World with Estevanico as a physical and moral guide.
In 1940, Estevanico was honored with one of the 33 dioramas at the American Negro Exposition in Chicago.
 Time Machine, a 2020 hybrid documentary by Moroccan filmmaker Tarek Bouraque, is set in a past/present/future time where Azemmouri, born in 1502, undertakes a journey to the 21st century.

See also
List of slaves
York (explorer)

References

Bibliography

Arrington, Carolyn. Black Explorer in Spanish Texas: Estevanico, Austin, TX: Eakin Press, 1986

Katz, William Loren. The Black West, Garden City, NJ: Doubleday & Company, Inc., 1971
Logan, Rayford. "Estevanico, Negro Discoverer of the Southwest: A Critical Reexamination", Phylon 1 (1940): 305–314.
Maura, Juan Francisco. Burlador de América: Alvar Núñez Cabeza de Vaca, Parnaseo/Lemir. Valencia: Universidad de Valencia, 2008.
Maura, Juan Francisco. “Nuevas interpretaciones sobre las aventuras de Alvar Núñez Cabeza de Vaca, Esteban de Dorantes, y Fray Marcos de Niza,” Revista de Estudios Hispánicos (PR). 29.1–2 (2002): 129–154.

Shepherd, Elizabeth. The Discoveries of Esteban the Black, New York: Dodd, Mead, 1970. pp. 111–4.

External links
"Estevanico", Handbook of Texas
"Estevanico", Enchantedlearning.com

1500s births
1539 deaths
Explorers of New Mexico
People from Azemmour
Explorers of North America
Converts to Roman Catholicism from Islam
Moroccan former Muslims
Spanish slaves
Portuguese slaves
Spanish explorers
African conquistadors
Spanish conquistadors
Moroccan Roman Catholics
People murdered in New Mexico
16th-century slaves
Moroccan expatriates in the United States